Car or Kar (Ancient Greek: Κάρ) is a name in Greek mythology that refers to two characters who may or may not be one and the same.

 Car, king of Megara and son of Phoroneus by Cerdo. His tomb was located on the road from Megara to Corinth. From Car, the acropolis at Megara derived its name Caria where the 'Chamber of Demeter' was said to have been built by him when he was the king of the land.
 Car, king of Caria.

Notes

References 

Herodotus, The Histories with an English translation by A. D. Godley. Cambridge. Harvard University Press. 1920. Online version at the Topos Text Project. Greek text available at Perseus Digital Library.
Pausanias, Description of Greece with an English Translation by W.H.S. Jones, Litt.D., and H.A. Ormerod, M.A., in 4 Volumes. Cambridge, MA, Harvard University Press; London, William Heinemann Ltd. 1918. Online version at the Perseus Digital Library
Pausanias, Graeciae Descriptio. 3 vols. Leipzig, Teubner. 1903.  Greek text available at the Perseus Digital Library.
Stephanus of Byzantium, Stephani Byzantii Ethnicorum quae supersunt, edited by August Meineike (1790-1870), published 1849. A few entries from this important ancient handbook of place names have been translated by Brady Kiesling. Online version at the Topos Text Project.

Kings in Greek mythology
Legendary progenitors